Vidgren is a Swedish-language surname, more common in Finland than in Sweden.

Geographical distribution
As of 2014, 71.9% of all known bearers of the surname Vidgren were residents of Finland (frequency 1:12,665), 24.7% of Sweden (1:66,086) and 1.8% of Denmark (1:513,140).

In Finland, the frequency of the surname was higher than national average (1:12,665) in the following regions:
 1. Northern Savonia (1:1,989)
 2. Päijänne Tavastia (1:5,269)
 3. Central Finland (1:7,047)
 4. Kainuu (1:10,241)

In Sweden, the frequency of the surname was higher than national average (1:66,086) in the following counties:
 1. Norrbotten County (1:3,800)
 2. Uppsala County (1:34,976)
 3. Gävleborg County (1:35,004)
 4. Södermanland County (1:39,888)
 5. Gotland County (1:58,481)
 6. Stockholm County (1:60,638)
 7. Kronoberg County (1:63,793)

People
 Tony Vidgren (born 1990), Finnish ice hockey player

References

Swedish-language surnames